Saint-Hippolyte may refer to:

Canada 
 Saint-Hippolyte, Quebec

France 
 Saint-Hippolyte, Aveyron
 Saint-Hippolyte, Cantal
 Saint-Hippolyte, Charente-Maritime
 Saint-Hippolyte, Doubs
 Saint-Hippolyte, Gironde
 Saint-Hippolyte, Indre-et-Loire
 Saint-Hippolyte, Pyrénées-Orientales
 Saint-Hippolyte, Haut-Rhin
 Saint-Hippolyte-de-Caton
 Saint-Hippolyte-de-Montaigu
 Saint-Hippolyte-du-Fort
 Saint-Hippolyte-le-Graveyron

See also
Saint Hippolytus
Hippolyte (disambiguation)
St Ippolyts